Shiju Abdul Rasheed is an Indian actor who works in Malayalam and Telugu films.  He is known by stage name Devi Shiju in Telugu films as he played a role in Kodi Ramakrishna's Devi. He has appeared in more than 50 films and several popular TV series.

Career
Shiju has a career that has spanned 14 years from Tollywood to Mollywood and on to an international movie. He was born on 4 August 1974 in Kerala, India. In 1996 was his debut and first success in a Tamil movie named Mahaprabhu, directed by A. Venkitesh. His performance as a villain in this movie gave him a major break in his career. He further worked in a Telugu movie named Devi, directed by Kodirama Krishna, which was a super hit. He then worked in various hit movies like Manasantha Nuve, Nuvu Nakku Natchavu, Simharasi and Ammayikosam. Moving on to Mollywood, he worked in Ishttamanu Nooruvattam, Kalachakram, Sidhartha, Vachalam, etc. There was a remarkable change in his career when he worked for an international film named In the Name of Buddha, directed by Rajesh Touchriver.

Shiju took a break in 2004 and shifted his focus into TV serials. He made a comeback with Proprietors: Kammath & Kammath in 2013. Further, he has done Malayalam movies Sound Thoma, Polytechnic, Dolphin Bar, Cousins and Sai baba: a Telugu movie.
Of late he has appeared in important roles in many Telugu movies, including Kirrak Party starring Nikhil Siddharth and Godse starring Satyadev Kancharana.

Personal life
Shiju is the youngest son of Rasheed and Ayisha in Kollam, Kerala. He has two elder siblings. He did his education from St. Albert's school, Ernakulam and S.S.M Polytechnic College, Tirur.

He is married to Preethi Prem, who was an airhostess for Kuwait Airways and a Bharatnatyam classical dancer. The couple have a daughter. The family currently resides in Eroor,Tripunithura.Ernakulam

Partial filmography
{| class="wikitable"
|-
! Year !! Film !! Role !! Language
!Notes
|-
|1995|| Mazhavilkoodaram||Suresh||Malayalam||Malayalam debut
|-
|Rowspan=7|1996|| Man of the Match||Jimmy George||Malayalam||
|-
|Ishtamanu Nooru Vattam||Sreeprasad||Malayalam||
|-
|Mahaprabhu ||Bhaskar||Tamil||Tamil debut
|-
|Yuvathruki|| ||Malayalam||
|-
|Mahatma The Great|| ||Malayalam||
|-
|Kanjirappally Kariachan ||College Student||Malayalam||
|-
|King Soloman||Ashok Nair||Malayalam||
|-
|1997||Vaachalam||Vinod||Malayalam||
|-
|1998||Sidhartha||Balu||Malayalam||
|-
|Rowspan=2|1999||Iranyan||||Tamil||
|-
| Devi ||Vijay||Telugu||Telugu Debut
|-
|Rowspan=4|2000|| Ayodhya|| ||Telugu||
|-
| Shatru|| ||Telugu||
|-
|Mr.Kokila|| ||Kannada||Kannada debut
|-
|Nilavil Kalangilll|| ||Tamil||
|-
|Rowspan=6|2001|| Simharasi|| ||Telugu||
|-
|Mazhamegha praavukal||Shyam||Malayalam||
|-
|Nuvvu Naaku Nachav ||Prasad||Telugu||
|-
|Chiranjeevulu||Kiran||Telugu||
|-
|Dosth||Shankar||Malayalam||Breakthrough performance
|-
|Manasantha Nuvve ||Anu's friend||Telugu||
|-
|rowspan=9|2002||Adrustam||Robin||Telugu||
|-
|Pasuppu Kunkuma|| ||Telugu||
|-
|Siva Rama Raju ||Swati's husband||Telugu||
|-
|Trinetram|| ||Telugu||
|-
|In the Name of Buddha ||||English||
|-
|True Identity|| ||English||
|-
|Sambhavi IPS|| ||Telugu||
|-
|Ammayi Kosam ||||Telugu||
|-
|Kaalachakram||Agnivesh||Malayalam||
|-
|2005||Gowtam SSC||Manoj||Telugu||
|-
|2010||Kaaryasthan||Himself||Malayalam||Guest appearance
|-
|rowspan=6|2013||Ezhu Sundara Rathrikal|| Alex's friend||Malayalam||
|-
|Pullipulikalum Aattinkuttiyum||Chakka Vijayan||Malayalam||
|-
|Nadodimannan||Owner of Demolition Company||Malayalam||
|-
|Proprietors: Kammath & Kammath||Sunnichan||Malayalam||
|-
|Vishudhan|| Monichan||Malayalam||
|-
|Sound Thoma||Plapparambil Joykutty||Malayalam||
|-
|Rowspan=7|2014||Cousins||Chandran||Malayalam||
|-
| Kuruthamkettavan|| ||Malayalam||
|-
| Avatharam || Bai Jabbar||Malayalam||
|-
| Dolphins ||||Malayalam||
|-
| rowspan="2" | Ring Master ||Kishor Kumar||Malayalam||
|-
| ||Malayalam||
|-
| Polytechnic ||||Malayalam||
|-
|2015||Jamna Pyari ||||Malayalam||
|-
|Rowspan=2|2016|| Supreme||Raja Rao||Telugu||
|-
| Pa Va||George||Malayalam||
|-
|Rowspan=4|2017 ||Lanka||||Telugu||
|-
|Sathamanam Bhavati||Raju's uncle||Telugu||
|-
|Jai Lava Kusa ||Priya's father||Telugu||
|-
| 2 Countries||Laya's step-father||Telugu||
|-
|Rowspan=10|2018|| Kirrak Party ||Meera's father||Telugu||
|-
|Raju Gadu ||Tanvi's father||Telugu||
|-
| Taxiwaala||Raghuram||Telugu||
|-
|Parichayam|| ||Telugu||
|-
| Chandamama Raave|| ||Telugu||
|-
|Oru Pazhaya Bomb Kadha||||Malayalam||
|-
|Uthammudu|| ||Telugu||
|-
|Made For Each Other|| ||Telugu||
|-
|Viswadabhi Rama Vinura Vema|| ||Telugu||
|-
|Bluff Master ||ACP Chandra Sekhar||Telugu||
|-
|Rowspan=3|2019||Jodi ||Raju||Telugu||
|-
| Iddari Lokam Okate ||Varsha's father||Telugu||
|-
|Patnagarh||||Odia||
|-
| rowspan="7" |2021
|One||Satheesh Manohar
|Malayalam||
|-
|Anaganaka okka Roudy|Reddy
|Telugu
|
|-
|Kothi Komachi|Hero father
|Telugu
|
|-
|Godse|CM
|Telugu
|
|-
|Hidumba|Police inspector
|Telugu
|
|-
|Raaja Yogam|Villan
|Telugu
|
|-
|Moneyshe|
|Telugu
|
|}

Television (partial)All TV series are in Malayalam-language, unless otherwise noted.''

References

External links
 
 Shiju at MSI
 http://entertainment.oneindia.in/celebs/shiju.html
 https://web.archive.org/web/20140222203009/http://www.metromatinee.com/artist/Shiju.-6423-UpcomingMovies
 http://www.malayalachalachithram.com/profiles.php?i=6932

Male actors from Kollam
Male actors in Malayalam cinema
Indian male film actors
Living people
21st-century Indian male actors
Indian male television actors
Male actors in Malayalam television
Male actors in Telugu television
Year of birth missing (living people)